The 1986 Philippine Basketball Association (PBA) rookie draft was an event at which teams drafted players from the amateur ranks.

Round 1

Round 2

Round 3

Undrafted players
Mukesh Advani
Joshua Villapando
Raymund Fran
Chris McGarry
Alejandro Regis
Ernesto Basnil
Francis Moncada
Meneles Viray

Notes
10 amateur cagers joined the PBA in the Third Conference when the Magnolia ballclub decided to return after a two-conference leave, eight former members of the fabled Northern Cement basketball team led by Samboy Lim and Elmer Reyes, who were also part of the RP squad that captured the bronze medal in the Seoul Asian Games, makes their debut as a professional players.

References

Philippine Basketball Association draft
draft